Henning Matriciani (born 14 March 2000) is a German professional footballer who plays as a right-back or centre-back for Bundesliga club Schalke 04.

Career statistics

References

Honours
Schalke 04
2. Bundesliga: 2021–22

External links
 Profile at the FC Schalke 04 website
 
 
 
 

2000 births
Living people
People from Lippstadt
Sportspeople from Arnsberg (region)
German footballers
Footballers from North Rhine-Westphalia
Association football fullbacks
Bundesliga players
2. Bundesliga players
Regionalliga players
SV Lippstadt 08 players
FC Schalke 04 II players
FC Schalke 04 players